Supernova is the debut studio album by Lisa Lopes of TLC and is the only one released in her lifetime, prior to her traffic collision-related death in 2002.

Album information
The album's original titles were "Fantasy1.com" and "A New Star is Born", but were eventually changed to "Supernova". The release date for the album was August 16, 2001, the day of her father's birthday, as well as her grandfather's death. This is alluded to in the lyrics of the song "A New Star Is Born". The United States release date was intended to be October 29, 2001, but the album's U.S release was cancelled due to poor sales overseas.

The album's first single, "The Block Party", was sent to radio in July 2001 and became a top 20 hit in the UK, but failed to chart on the Billboard Hot 100. The second single was to have been "Hot!", however, when the album release was canceled in the United States, all further singles were canceled. Though the album was canceled by Arista, Lopes tried selling the album on her website (Eyenetics), but to no success.

Several tracks from the album were remixed by Death Row Records for Lopes' planned N.I.N.A album. The album was cancelled after Lopes' death, but was leaked online in 2011. Songs from the album were re-released in a remixed form in 2009 as Eye Legacy.

Track listing 
Credits are adapted from the album's Liner Notes

Release history

References

2001 debut albums
Lisa Lopes albums
Arista Records albums